Kagamil Island, in the Islands of Four Mountains subgroup of the Aleutian archipelago, is  north of Chuginadak Island and  south of Uliaga Island.

Henry Wood Elliott discovered a cave on the island containing 13 native mummies. Over 50 bodies were recovered by Aleš Hrdlička from 1936 to 1938.

References

External links

picture of Kagamil Island

Islands of Four Mountains
Islands of Alaska
Islands of Unorganized Borough, Alaska